Movin may refer to:

Lisbeth Movin (1917–2011), a Danish actress
Movin, Iran or Mavin, a village in Iran
Movin' (brand), a radio station brand used in the United States

See also
Moving (disambiguation)